Kızılada, aka Kızıl Ada, anciently Lagusa or Lagousa, or Lagussa or Lagoussa, is a Turkish island in the Mediterranean Sea situated in the Fethiye Bay, southwestern Turkey.

The island hosts also the 19-century Kızılada Lighthouse on its southern point, which was redeveloped into a seafood restaurant in 2007 and a hostel with nine rooms in 2008. Kızılada is a popular stopover for boat tours around Fethiye.

Aviation accident
With the help of the keeper Mustafa Pehlivan of the Kızılada Lighthouse, customs officials and fishermen, 38 people of the 8 aircrew and 34 passengers on board of the aircraft of type Lockheed L-749A Constellation survived the accident while four elderly passengers died by drowning. The location of the aircraft's wreck underwater remains still unknown.

Forestry
Named after its reddish-brown appearance, the island was forested again in 2014 with about 5,000 saplings of Turkish pine (Pinus brutia), laurel (Laurus nobilis), carob (Ceratonia siliqua) and Turkish sweetgum (Liquidambar orientalis). After plantation, the saplings were treated with banishing chemicals to protect them from wild goat (Capra aegagrus) and hare (Lepus) living on the island.
The forested area makes out around 40% of the island, which is covered by scrub vegetation.

References

Islands of Turkey
Mediterranean islands
Turkish Riviera
Tourist attractions in Muğla Province
Islands of Muğla Province
Fethiye